Santa Maradona is a 2001 Italian comedy film directed by Marco Ponti.

Cast 
Stefano Accorsi as Andrea
Anita Caprioli as Dolores
Libero De Rienzo as Bartolomeo "Bart" Vanzetti
Mandala Tayde as Lucia
Fabio Troiano as Marco, Lucia's boyfriend
Franco Neri as Pizzaiolo

References

External links 

2001 films
2001 comedy films
Films set in Turin
Films directed by Marco Ponti
Italian comedy films
2001 directorial debut films